Hermann Robert Homburg (17 March 1874 – 12 December 1964) was a South Australian politician and lawyer.

Early life
Homburg was born in Norwood and educated at Prince Alfred College and the University of Adelaide. Following his admission to the bar in 1897, he practised law at his father's legal firm, Homburg & Melrose. Homburg's German-born father, Robert Homburg, was also a prominent South Australian politician and lawyer. Robert Homburg had served as Attorney-General of South Australia on three separate occasions, and also, later, as a justice of the Supreme Court of South Australia, the first non-British migrant to be appointed to such a position in Australia.

Homburg supported participation in sport more than watching it. He was member and captain of the Glen Osmond Cricket Club and chairman of the North Adelaide Cycling Club.

Before World War I
Representing his father's former electorate, Hermann Homburg served as a non-Labor Party member for Murray in the House of Assembly from 1906 to 1915. He became Attorney-General under Premier Archibald Peake in 1909 and also Minister for Industry from 1912 to 1915. 

The outbreak of World War I in 1914 resulted in widespread distrust and persecution of German-Australians. In 1914, while he was Attorney-General, Homburg's government office in Adelaide was raided by soldiers with fixed bayonets. He soon fell victim to anti-German sentiment and resigned in early 1915 to avoid embarrassing the government in the forthcoming election. Homburg wrote of a "campaign of lies and calumnies against me... because I am not of British lineage."

Between the wars
In 1927, Homburg successfully contested Murray again and returned to parliament. He served as Attorney-General and Minister for Industry in the R. L. Butler ministry from 1927 until losing his seat in 1930. From 1933 to 1941 he was a member of the Legislative Council. He was also a leader of Adelaide's secular German community during the interwar period.

Despite his many years of public service, Homburg's loyalties were once again questioned following the advent of World War II. His home and private office were searched and he was interned on 25 November 1940 but released after appeal on 21 December, under open conditional arrest, one condition being that he moved interstate. In January 1941 he relocated to Melbourne and then moved to Ballarat whereupon he retired from parliament. The judges at Homburg's appeal concluded, "it is obvious that one or more of the persons reporting may have a grudge against the objector Homburg and under pledge of secrecy be willing to lie to cause him distress and trouble."

After politics
Homburg returned to Adelaide in 1942 and continued to practice as a solicitor until his death in 1964. He wrote about his experiences during both wars in South Australian Lutherans and War-Time Rumours (1947).

References

Bibliography

1874 births
1964 deaths
Australian people of German descent
People educated at Prince Alfred College
Politicians from Adelaide
Lawyers from Adelaide
Members of the South Australian House of Assembly
Members of the South Australian Legislative Council
Liberal and Country League politicians
Attorneys-General of South Australia
Adelaide Law School alumni